The Bartini Beriev VVA-14 Vertikaľno-Vzletayushchaya Amfibiya (vertical take-off amphibious aircraft) was a wing-in-ground-effect aircraft developed in the Soviet Union during the early 1970s.  Designed to be able to take off from the water and fly at high speed over long distances, it was to make true flights at high altitude, but also have the capability of flying efficiently just above the sea surface, using aerodynamic ground effect.  The VVA-14 was designed by Hungarian-born designer Robert Bartini in answer to a perceived requirement to destroy United States Navy Polaris missile submarines. The final aircraft was retired in 1987.

Development
Bartini, in collaboration with the Beriev Design Bureau intended to develop the prototype VVA-14 in three phases. The VVA-14M1 was to be an aerodynamics and technology testbed, initially with rigid pontoons on the ends of the central wing section, and later with these replaced by inflatable pontoons. The VVA-14M2 was to be more advanced, with two starting engines to blast into the cavity under the wing to give lift and later with a battery of lift engines to give VTOL capability, and with fly-by-wire flight controls. The VVA-14M3 would see the VTOL vehicle fully equipped with armament and with the Burevestnik computerised anti-submarine warfare (ASW) system, Bor-1 magnetic anomaly detector (MAD) and other operational equipment.

Operational history
After extensive research, including the development of the small prototype Be-1 wing in ground effect aircraft, the first VVA-14 prototype was completed in 1972. Its first flight was from a conventional runway on 4 September 1972.

In 1974, inflatable pontoons were installed, though their operation caused many problems. Flotation and water taxi tests followed, culminating in the start of flight testing of the amphibious aircraft on 11 June 1975.

The inflatable pontoons were later replaced by rigid pontoons, while the fuselage was lengthened and the starting engines added. This incarnation was given the designation 14M1P. The bureau supplying the intended battery of 12 RD-36-35PR lift engines did not deliver, and this made VTOL testing impossible.

After Bartini's death in 1974, the project slowed and eventually drew to a close, the aircraft having conducted 107 flights, with a total flight time of 103 hours. The only remaining VVA-14, No. 19172, was retired to the Soviet Central Air Force Museum, Moscow in 1987. As a result of uncertain accidents during the shipping to museum, the aircraft received some damage, but these damages were not repaired afterwards. The aircraft still resides at the museum in a dismantled state, where it carries the designations "10687" and "Aeroflot".

Specifications (VVA-14M1)

See also

References

 
 

Komissarov, Sergey. “Russia's Ekranoplans”. Hinkley. Midland Publishing. 2002. 
Komissarov, Sergey and Yefim Gordon. Soviet and Russian Ekranoplans. Hersham, UK: Ian Allan Publishing, 2010. .

External links

 VVA-14 on Google Maps

1970s Soviet anti-submarine aircraft
VVA-14
Ekranoplans
Abandoned military aircraft projects of the Soviet Union
VVA-14, Bartini Beriev
Aircraft first flown in 1972